Carabobo FC is a Venezuelan professional football team playing at the top level, the Venezuelan Primera División. It is based in Valencia.

History

Stadium
Their home stadium is Estadio Misael Delgado.

Titles
Primera División Venezolana: 1Amateur Era (0):Professional Era (1): 1971 (as Valencia FC)Segunda División Venezolana: 11990 (as Valencia FC)Segunda División B Venezolana: 0 :Tercera División Venezolana: 0 :Copa de Venezuela: 21965, 1978 (both as Valencia FC)

Performance in CONMEBOL competitionsCopa Libertadores: 4 appearances1970: First Round
1972: First Round
1974: First Round
2017: Second StageCopa Sudamericana: 3 appearances'''
2004: Second Preliminary Round
2006: Preliminary Round
2007: Preliminary Round

Current first team

External links
Official website
Unofficial website

 
Football clubs in Venezuela
Association football clubs established in 1997
Valencia, Venezuela